Ectoedemia gambiana is a moth of the  family Nepticulidae. It was described by Gustafsson in 1972. It is known from Gambia.

References

Nepticulidae
Moths of Africa
Moths described in 1972